Nicolás Delgadillo Godoy (born 2 October 1997) is an Argentine footballer who plays as a left winger for Platense, on loan from Vélez Sarsfield in the Argentine Primera División.

Career
Delgadillo played youth football in Vélez Sarsfield and started his professional career when he was 17, entering the field in a 0–1 defeat to San Lorenzo de Almagro for the 2015 Argentine Primera División. He scored his first goal in a 1–3 defeat to San Martín de San Juan later on in the tournament. At the end of the season, and despite his team's low performance, Delgadillo was scouted by Spanish powerhouses Real Madrid CF and Valencia CF, although in the end he stayed in Vélez.

On 11 January 2019, Delgadillo was loaned out to San Martín de Tucumán. On 1 August 2019, it was announced that Delgadillo had been loaned out to Patronato. Delgadillo scored his first goal for Patronato on 11 April 2021 during a match against Club de Gimnasia y Esgrima La Plata. After two years at Patronato, Delgadillo was loaned out to Platense for the 2022 season.

References

External links
 Profile at Vélez Sarsfield's official website 
 
 

Living people
1997 births
Footballers from Buenos Aires
Argentine footballers
Association football forwards
Association football midfielders
Argentine Primera División players
Primera Nacional players
Club Atlético Vélez Sarsfield footballers
San Martín de Tucumán footballers
Club Atlético Patronato footballers
Club Atlético Platense footballers